Larry Brian McElreavy (born September 25, 1946) is a former American football player and coach. From 1983 to 1985 he led the New Haven Chargers, going 12–18. From 1986 to 1988 he was head coach at Columbia University (the Lions), going 2–28. McElreavy resigned following the 1988 season and finished his head coaching career with an overall record of 14–46.

After leaving coaching, McElreavy went into the real estate business. He currently works as a car salesman in Bellows Falls, Vermont.

Head coaching record

References

1946 births
Living people
Columbia Lions football coaches
New Hampshire Wildcats football players
New Haven Chargers football coaches
Penn Quakers football coaches
Yale Bulldogs football coaches
People from Claremont, New Hampshire